Alexander Gennadyevich Sazonov is a Russian professional ice hockey defenceman who currently plays for and is captain of Vityaz Chekhov in the Kontinental Hockey League.

References

External links

1980 births
Living people
Russian ice hockey defencemen
Traktor Chelyabinsk players
Avangard Omsk players
Zauralie Kurgan players